Georg Friedrich Baltrusch (7 March 1876 in Waldhof, East Prussia (German Empire) – 22 April 1949 in Bad Wildungen, West Germany), was a german military officer and a political for the German Democratic Party/CDU. One of the leaders of the Jungdeutscher Orden, he had a place in the German Parliament between 1930 and 1933. After World War II, he was one of the founder of CDU ..

References

1876 births
1949 deaths
People from Giżycko County
People from the Province of Prussia
German Protestants
German State Party politicians
Members of the Reichstag of the Weimar Republic
Young German Order members